Emilie Högquist is a 1939 Swedish historical drama film directed by Gustaf Molander and starring Georg Rydeberg, Signe Hasso, and Anna Lindahl. It portrays the life of the 19th-century actress Emilie Högquist. The film was a commercial failure, and its production company Svensk Filmindustri suffered its largest financial losses of the decade.

The film's art direction was done by Arne Åkermark.

Main cast
 Georg Rydeberg as Prince Oscar  
 Signe Hasso as Emelie Högqvist  
 Anna Lindahl as Hanna Högqvist  
 Sture Lagerwall as Jean Högqvist  
 Tollie Zellman as Mrs. Högqvist 
 Karl-Arne Holmsten as Christer Örnclou  
 Georg Løkkeberg as Arthur Bloomfield  
 Björn Berglund as August Blanche  
 Bengt Djurberg as Wilhelm von Braun 
 Elsa Burnett as Princess Josephine  
 Irma Christenson as Marianne Berend  
 Olof Winnerstrand as Baron von Brinkman  
 Sven Bergvall as Col. Fleming  
 Anna-Lisa Baude as Mrs. Grönlund  
 Hilding Gavle as Claes Stjernholm  
 Elsa Ebbesen as Kristin  
 Hugo Björne as Westerstrand  
 Karin Alexandersson as Fina  
 Olav Riégo as Johan  
 Gunnar Sjöberg as Knut Almlöf

References

Further reading 
 Mariah Larsson & Anders Marklund. Swedish Film: An Introduction and Reader. Nordic Academic Press, 2010.

External links 
 

1939 films
1930s historical drama films
Swedish historical drama films
1930s Swedish-language films
Films directed by Gustaf Molander
Films set in the 19th century
Swedish black-and-white films
1939 drama films
1930s Swedish films